Dumitru Matcovschi (20 October 1939 – 26 June 2013) was a writer from Moldova who was a member of the Academy of Sciences of Moldova. He was a founder of the Popular Front of Moldova.

Biography 
Dumitru Matcovschi was born to Leonte and Eudochia Matcovschi on 20 October 1939 in Vadul-Raşcov, then in Romania. He graduated from the Moldova State University in 1961. Dumitru Matcovschi was a founder of the Democratic Movement of Moldova and Popular Front of Moldova.
 Matcovschi died on 26 June 2013 following surgery on 14 June to remove a brain tumor.

Awards
 Honorary citizen Chişinău

References

Bibliography 
 Ana Ghilaş, Dumitru Matcovschi: Parintii. In Limba romana, 1994;
 Enciclopedia Sovietică Moldovenească.
 Literatura şi Arta Moldovei. Enciclopedie. Chişinău. Redacţia Enciclopediei
 Valerian Ciobanu. Nume şi Lume. Chişinău. Editura Pontos. 2008

External links 

  Lista membrilor Academiei de Ştiinţe a Moldovei
 Raportul Comisiei Cojocaru
 Dumitru Matcovschi, biografie
 Omagiu septuagenarului Dumitru Matcovschi

1939 births
Romanian people of Moldovan descent
People from Șoldănești District
Eastern Orthodox Christians from Romania
Moldova State University alumni
Moldovan writers
Moldovan male writers
Popular Front of Moldova
Popular Front of Moldova politicians
2013 deaths